Tiriki is one of sixteen  clans and dialects of the Abaluyia people of Western Kenya.  The word Tiriki is also used to refer to their Geographical Location in Hamisi Division, Vihiga County, in the Western province of Kenya. Hamisi Constituency now Hamisi Sub County is one of the longest in Kenya stretching from kiboswa(Ny'angori) to Shiru which borders Kapsabet and Musunji which borders Kakamega Forest. Some also moved to nandi county and occupied aldai and other parts of nandi county.

Administrative 
Tiriki is located in the Republic of Kenya in Vihiga County. Vihiga County is one of the five counties that formed the former Western Province. The other counties in the former Western Province are Kakamega (which Vihiga was previously a part of), Bungoma, and Busia. Trans Nzoia county is located in the former Rift Valley but has a  majority Abaluyia population. Nandi County in the former Rift Valley province also has a sizable but minority Abaluyia population.

The name Hamisi refers to Hamisi Division or sub-county of Vihiga county which is overseen by a District Officer. The name Hamisi also refers to Hamisi constituency which is represented in the Kenya National Assembly by a Member of Parliament. The name Hamisi also refers to the Administrative Capital of Hamisi Constituency where majority of government offices in the Division are located. The name Hamisi itself was derived from a trader who run a shop in the area from the early days of colonialism. The typical way the Tiriki refer to Hamisi is "Wa-Hamisi" which means the place of Hamisi.

Tiriki location is just under 40 kilometers long running southwest to north east. It is roughly shaped like a dumbbell. About 5 km wide in the south west, less than 2 km wide in the centre, and 8 km wide in the north east.

The total land areas is about 110 squire kilometers of which about 30 square kilometers are Kaimosi forest.

Latitude, longitude, and altitude 
Tiriki lies at a Latitude of 0.09 degrees North and a Longitude of 34.85 degrees East. The average altitude is 1740m or 5709 ft above sea level.

Weather 
Rainfall ranges from a low of about 4 cm in February to a high of about 12 cm in October. October and April have over 20 days of rainfall. January and February average about 10 days of rainfall.

Tiriki clans 
Tiriki clans include Vikhava, Valukhova, Vakhadiri, Vahaliero, Vajisinde, Vaumbo, Vashitsungu, Vamavi, Vamiluha, Valukhombe, Vadura, Vamayudu, Vamuli, Vasamia, Varimbuli, Vavuga, Vasaniaga, Vanyonji, Vamoiya, Vamasese,vaguga,Turug'a(vamuruga mmluga) and Vasuba. ('Walking with Joel' - The Mwanzi Dynasty)) We also have the Bamahalia clan.

Tirikis live in proximity with the Maragoli, Nandi, Luo, Banyore and the Idakho, their fellow Luhya tribes and hence the similarities with three clans of the Maragoli i.e.  Vakizungu, Vamavi and Vasaniaga. Among all of the Luyha tribes, the Tiriki are particularly famous for their circumcision ceremonies with elaborate masks and body paint akin to Luhyas of Kabras in Malava (or Terik of the Nandi tribe) held in forests around in Western and parts of Trans-Nzoia province.

The Tiriki speak Ludiriji (more widely referred to Lutirichi or Tiriki, according to Ethnologue) and occupy the area North of Hamisi District in localities like Wamisi (Hamisi), Shamakhokho, Lwandon, Erusui, Esenende (home of Senende Boys High School), Igavinjari, Igavsotichi, Ichitinda, Muhudu, Musunji, Kaptisi, Ibumbo, Ishiru, Tindinyo, Gamalenga,  and the border town of Seremi which borders Aldai (Nandi); Rift Valley Province.

Kaimosi 
Kaimosi Mission, which is surrounded by Tiriki land, was the first Christian mission to be established in Western Kenya province in 1902. It became the principal centre of Friends work in East Africa.

Today the Kaimosi Mission hosts the NCCK Jumuia Friends Hospital which was formerly Kaimosi Hospital. It also hosts Friends Kaimosi university. It hosts the Friends Theological College, Kaimosi Teachers training College, Kaimosi Girls High School, and Kaimosi Friends Primary School, Kaimosi boys High School,Kaimosi special School, Kaimosi Demonstration High School, Kaimosi Friends vacational training School, and Friends College Kaimosi.

Notable persons 

 Daudi Kabaka, Kenya's most famous musician.
 Cyrus Jirongo, the founding Secretary General of Youth for Kanu 92
 Philip Kisia, Nairobi Town Clerk.
 Johnston Kavuludi, Chairman of the National Police Service Commission.
 Cliff Mukulu, founder of Rentworks
 Adema Sangale, CEO of Proctor and Gamble East Africa
Justice Daniel Anganyanga, Judge of the Court of Appeal
Professor George Godia, Permanent Secretary Ministry of Education
James Simani, Ambassador to China
Meshack Igobua, Headmaster Upper Hill School
Ambassador Charles Amira
Patricia Amira, Media personality and communication specialist

See also
 Idaxo-Isuxa-Tiriki language
 Luhya people
 Luhya languages

References

Luhya
Kenyan Luhya people